"En Ami" is the fifteenth episode of the seventh season of the science fiction television series The X-Files. It premiered on the Fox network in the United States on March 19, 2000. The episode helped to explore the series' overarching mythology. "En Ami" earned a Nielsen household rating of 7.5, being watched by 11.99 million people in its initial broadcast. The episode received mostly positive reviews from critics, although elements of the script, as well as The Smoking Man's (William B. Davis) motives, were criticized.

The show centers on FBI special agents Fox Mulder (David Duchovny) and Dana Scully (Gillian Anderson) who work on cases linked to the paranormal, called X-Files. Mulder is a believer in the paranormal, while the skeptical Scully has been assigned to debunk his work. In this episode, Scully is intrigued after a young boy with cancer, whose parents don't believe in medical treatment because it is against God's will, recovers miraculously. What she soon discovers is that his cure is not miraculous, but scientific. Eager, if wary, to learn of the truth behind his secrets, Scully agrees to travel with the Smoking Man to get the cure to all mankind's diseases.

The script was Davis' first—and only—writing contribution to the series. Davis, inspired by the Shakespeare play Richard III, wanted to write a story wherein The Smoking Man was able to lure Scully in by enticing her with medical knowledge. In addition, "En Ami" was the last episode of The X-Files to be directed by Rob Bowman. The episode's title means "as a friend" in French and also functions as a pun, reading phonetically as "enemy" in English.

Plot
In Goochland, Virginia, Jason McPeck, a young cancer patient, is ushered out of his parents' car, carried past cameras and shouting onlookers, and placed in his bed, where his father tells him that God will decide if he can be cured of his cancer. Later in the night, the boy sees bright light and men in black walking towards his window. The next day, the boy is miraculously cured of his cancer.

Fox Mulder (David Duchovny) and Dana Scully (Gillian Anderson) are anonymously given information about Jason's case, and they soon investigate. At the McPeck house, Jason says that angels came to him and one of them pinched the back of his neck, and now his cancer is gone.  Scully examines his neck and finds an incision exactly like the one she received when she was abducted. Upon leaving, Scully finds The Smoking Man (William B. Davis) in her car. The Smoking Man tells her that he was the one who saved Jason's life, and that since he is dying he wants to atone for his previously evil behavior by giving the cure to Scully. Scully leaves, but not before The Smoking Man gives her his phone number. Scully traces the number to The Smoking Man's office address. He explains that he is dying of a cerebral inflammation that developed after his surgery (The Sixth Extinction II: Amor Fati).  She agrees to go on a trip to retrieve the cure, but wears a wire, in order to send taped recordings of their conversations to Mulder.

During the trip, The Smoking Man tells Scully that he believes he shares a special kinship with her because he once held her own life in his hands. Mulder finds a message Scully left on his phone suspicious and goes to her apartment, where the landlord tells him that she left with her driver whom he describes as being "an older guy" who is "tall" and "smokes like a chimney". The Smoking Man and Scully arrive at the home of Marjorie Butters (Louise Latham), a 118-year-old gardener who also has the chip implanted in the back of her neck. Meanwhile, Mulder visits Walter Skinner (Mitch Pileggi) to voice his concern, but Scully calls Skinner during the meeting and says that she is fine. At a gas station, Scully removes the wire, places it in an envelope, and mails it to Mulder. However, a man following the two removes the letter from the mailbox.

The Lone Gunmen come to Mulder's apartment in disguise and tell him that they cannot find Scully. They reveal that they have found e-mails between Scully and a man called Cobra, who is apparently working on a shadow project at the Department of Defense.  Meanwhile, Scully wakes up in a cabin in Pennsylvania in pajamas instead of her clothes, and accuses The Smoking Man of drugging her. He claims she was merely exhausted and he was trying to make her comfortable.  She attempts to leave but decides to continue when The Smoking Man tells her she's free to go and that the choice of whether to accept his help or not is hers. Mulder and The Lone Gunmen go to Skinner to figure out why Scully was communicating with Cobra. They find that an anonymous person has hacked into Scully's computer and has been sending Cobra messages calling for a meeting. The group believe that it is the work of The Smoking Man, but Skinner still does not know how to get a hold of him. At dinner, The Smoking Man tells Scully that the cure he possesses is not just the cure for cancer, but for all human disease, and that it is extraterrestrial. The Smoking Man goes outside and tells the man who has been following them that Cobra has not shown. Scully finds a note under her dessert plate saying to meet at Calico Cove at dawn. She goes alone and is stopped by Cobra, who gives her a disc before being shot and killed with the use of a scoped rifle by the man who had been previously following The Smoking Man and Scully. The man also attempts to kill Scully, but is killed by The Smoking Man.

Scully leaves The Smoking Man and gives the disc to The Lone Gunmen to analyze, but it turns out that The Smoking Man swapped the disc for a blank one. She goes back to his office but it has been emptied. Mulder informs her that this was a con and she was used to retrieve this information, but he does not understand why The Smoking Man left Scully alive. The final scene shows The Smoking Man throwing the real disc into a lake.

Production

Writing

"En Ami" was written by William B. Davis, who portrayed The Smoking Man. Davis wanted to write an episode in which his character attempted to seduce Scully with something that she cared about: medical knowledge. Davis approached series creator Chris Carter with his idea, and Carter was intrigued. He assigned executive producer Frank Spotnitz to work with Davis and craft a full-fledged script. The script was revised several times, and many of Davis's scenes were cut, including one that featured The Smoking Man teaching Scully how to water-ski. The episode's original script also featured Alex Krycek, whose presence was "integral to the [original] storyline", but this story element too was cut. The first draft of the script was finished in four weeks.

While Davis saw his character as a "romantic hero", Carter and Spotnitz were reluctant to have "Scully [trust] this man she's spent seven years hating" so easily. Eventually, the producers tweaked the script, adding "the reality of The X-Files'''s existing mythos and past character development" to ease the transition. Davis later noted, "I was basically happy with the way [the episode] turned out, despite the fact that there were many other ideas that I had that I did not get to see. My original conception of the story was that Cigarette-Smoking Man was a much better actor at winning Scully's affections and that Scully was less resistant to this attention to her." Because The Smoking Man was able to manipulate Scully, Carter later referred to "En Ami" as "the creepiest episode of the year."

While elements from this episode were partially inspired by Shakespeare's play Richard III (namely, Richard's attempts to woo Lady Anne), Davis initially wrote the episode so that he could act with Gillian Anderson. He later noted, "If they're not going to give me a scene with Gillian, I'll just have to write one myself." The episode's title, "En Ami," translates from French into English as "as a friend." The title also functions as a pun, reading phonetically as "enemy" in English.

Filming

"En Ami" was directed by Rob Bowman and marked his last contribution to the show. Regarding his departure, he later said: "Artistically I felt like I couldn't help any more." Originally, "En Ami" was supposed to air during the first half of seventh season, but the producers realized that placing the episode so close to the Mulder-centric "The Sixth Extinction"/"Amor Fati" arc made character development problematic. It was thus decided to bump the episode to the middle of the season.

Production and filming for the episode were rushed, which resulted in idiosyncrasies. The scene featuring The Smoking Man and Scully eating dinner at a restaurant was actually filmed on two different days: Anderson's side of the scene was shot on one day and Davis' was shot on another. The short schedule also resulted in some quick scene construction, most notably for the dock sequence near the end of the episode. A majority of the lake scenes were filmed at Lake Sherwood, California. A stunt actor, Danny Weselis, filled in for Anderson during the scenes that called for her to drive the motor boat.

Broadcast and reception
"En Ami" first aired in the United States on March 19, 2000. This episode earned a Nielsen rating of 7.5, with an 11 share, meaning that roughly 7.5 percent of all television-equipped households, and 11 percent of households watching television, were tuned in to the episode. It was viewed by 11.99 million viewers. The episode aired in the United Kingdom and Ireland on Sky1 on June 25, 2000, and received 0.62 million viewers, ranking as the fourth most watched episode that week. Fox promoted the episode with a faux-cigarette ad that read "Warning: Tonight's episode contains the Cigarette Smoking Man and may be harmful to Agent Scully's health." The episode was later included on The X-Files Mythology, Volume 3 – Colonization, a DVD collection that contains episodes involved with the alien Colonist's plans to take over the earth.

Robert Shearman and Lars Pearson, in their book Wanting to Believe: A Critical Guide to The X-Files, Millennium & The Lone Gunmen, rated the episode four-and-a-half stars out of five. The two praised the episode, writing, "The plot itself is all smoke (ahem) and mirrors, but that doesn't really matter" and  "Davis' skills as both an actor and writer is […] very moving." Rich Rosell from DigitallyObsessed.com awarded the episode 4 out of 5 stars and wrote "Get out your flowcharts to try and keep things straight, as we get to learn a little more about Cigarette Smoking Man and his hijinks, in this ep written by ol' smoky himself. Scully and CSM get some edgy moments together, as info is revealed about an extraterrestrial-based cure for all human diseases. To further confuse things Black-Haired Man from The X-Files feature film shows up, but so do The Lone Gunmen, so all is not lost."

Zack Handlen of The A.V. Club'' awarded the episode a "B+" and wrote that "it mostly overcomes some significant script flaws". He was critical of the fact that the script "requires Scully to be a lot more naive than she usually is". Handlen wrote that, because the episode was not as believable as it could have been this far into the series, the reveal that The Smoking Man is using Scully is "more disappointing than shocking." Despite these setbacks, he concluded that the episode is largely sound because of the performances of Davis and Anderson, as well as the fact that the entry allowed the audience to gain insight into The Smoking Man's motives. Kenneth Silber from Space.com was not happy with the ambiguity of The Smoking Man, writing, "Perhaps unsurprisingly, the episode provides few answers. And the ending, with its high degree of ambiguity, provides little satisfaction. This reviewer, for one, is puzzled about both CSM's physical condition and his state of mind."

Explanatory notes

Footnotes

Bibliography

External links 

 

2000 American television episodes
Television episodes set in Pennsylvania
The X-Files (season 7) episodes
Television episodes set in Virginia